Sick of You may refer to:
"Sick of You" (Cake song), 2010
"Sick of You" (Gwar song), 1990
"Sick of You", a song from the Selena Gomez and the Scene album A Year Without Rain, 2010
"I'm Sick of You", a single by The Stooges, 1977